The Tristelhorn (also known as Piz da Sterls) is a mountain of the Glarus Alps, located on the border between the Swiss cantons of St. Gallen and Graubünden. Reaching a height of 3,114 metres above sea level, it is one of the highest summits in the canton of St. Gallen.

The Tristelhorn is located west of the Ringelspitz, on the range separating the Calfeisen valley (St. Gallen) from the Rhine valley near Flims (Graubünden).

References

External links
 Tristelhorn on Hikr

Mountains of the Alps
Alpine three-thousanders
Mountains of Switzerland
Glarus thrust
Mountains of the canton of St. Gallen
Mountains of Graubünden
Graubünden–St. Gallen border
Flims